Parkhotel Valkenburg Cycling Team is a UCI Women's Continental Team based in the Netherlands, which competes in elite women's road bicycle races such as the UCI Women's World Tour. The team was established in 2013 and received an UCI licence in 2014.

History

2014

The 2014 women's road cycling season was the first for the Parkhotel Valkenburg Continental Team as an UCI women's team.

2015

2018

Former rider in the team Esra Tromp retired from racing to take on the role as team manager for Parkhotel Valkenburg in 2018 after sustaining multiple physical setbacks in 2017.

Team roster

Major wins

2015
Trofee Maarten Wynants, Natalie van Gogh
Stage 2 Auensteiner–Radsporttage, Rozanne Slik
Stage 1 Belgium Tour, Natalie van Gogh
2017
Omloop van de IJsseldelta, Nina Buijsman
Draai van de Kaai, Sophie de Boer
VR Women, Hanna Solovey
Tour Cycliste Féminin International de l'Ardèche
Stage 7, Pauliena Rooijakkers
Team classification

2018
 Sprints classification Setmana Ciclista Valenciana, Belle de Gast
Volta Limburg Classic, Belle de Gast
 Sprints classification Healthy Ageing Tour, Natalie van Gogh
7-Dorpenomloop Aalburg, Lorena Wiebes
Omloop van de IJsseldelta, Lorena Wiebes
Stage 2a BeNe Ladies Tour, Lorena Wiebes

2019
Nokere Koerse, Lorena Wiebes
Volta Limburg Classic, Demi Vollering
Brabantse Pijl, Sofie De Vuyst
Omloop van Borsele, Lorena Wiebes
 Youth classification Healthy Ageing Tour, Lorena Wiebes
 Overall Tour of Chongming Island, Lorena Wiebes
 Points classification, Lorena Wiebes
 Young rider classification, Lorena Wiebes
Stages 1, 2 & 3, Lorena Wiebes
Prologue Grand Prix Elsy Jacobs, Demi Vollering
Diamond Tour, Lorena Wiebes
 European Games, Road Race, Lorena Wiebes
Stage 3 BeNe Ladies Tour, Lorena Wiebes
RideLondon Classique, Lorena Wiebes
Stage 1 Ladies Tour of Norway, Lorena Wiebes
 Points classification Holland Ladies Tour, Lorena Wiebes
 Young rider classification, Lorena Wiebes
Stages 1 & 2, Lorena Wiebes
Giro dell'Emilia Internazionale Donne Elite, Demi Vollering

2020
Omloop van het Hageland, Lorena Wiebes

2021
Stage 1 BeNe Ladies Tour, Mischa Bredewold

2022
 Combativity classification Bloeizone Fryslân Tour, Mischa Bredewold
Leiedal Koerse, Femke Markus

National champions
2016
 Germany Track (Omnium), Anna Knauer

2019
 Netherlands Road Race, Lorena Wiebes

References

External links
 

Cycling teams based in the Netherlands
UCI Women's Teams
Cycling teams established in 2013